Butlin's is a chain of large seaside resorts in the United Kingdom. Butlin's was founded by Billy Butlin to provide affordable holidays for ordinary British families.

Between 1936 and 1966, ten camps were built, including one in Ireland and one in the Bahamas. In the 1970s and 1980s, Butlin's also operated numerous large hotels, including one in Spain, a number of smaller holiday parks in England and France, and a revolving restaurant in the Post Office Tower in London.

Tough competition from overseas package holiday operators, rising operational costs, and rapidly changing demand, forced many of the Butlin's operations to close in the 1980s and 1990s. Three of the original camps remain open under the Butlins brand in Bognor Regis, Minehead, and Skegness. They are now owned and run by Butlins Skyline Ltd, which is now wholly owned by the Harris Family Trust.

History

Billy Butlin's inspiration for his holiday camp empire came from an unhappy holiday on Barry Island in his youth, when he had been locked out of his bed and breakfast accommodation all day by his landlady, which was normal practice at the time. 
The first of the Butlin's holiday camps was opened by Butlin in 1936 in Skegness, following his success in developing amusement parks. A second camp quickly followed in Clacton in 1938, and construction of Filey Holiday Camp began in 1939. With the outbreak of the Second World War, building at Filey was postponed, and the camps at Skegness and Clacton were given over for military use. Wartime use of Butlin's camps continued, with resorts at Ayr, Filey, and Pwllheli being completed and opened as military camps. The Ayr camp was later renamed Wonderwest World, and is now owned and run by Haven, part of Bourne Leisure, who previously owned both brands.

In 1945, with the war over, Filey was re-opened as a holiday camp. The camps at Skegness & Clacton opened in 1946, Ayr and Pwllheli in 1947 and Mosney on the east coast of Ireland in 1948. Butlin's became popular in post-war Britain, with family entertainment and activities available for the equivalent of a week's pay.

In 1948, Butlin acquired two hotels in the Bahamas, and in the 1950s Butlin's began acquiring hotels in England and Wales: Saltdean, near Brighton (1953), Blackpool (1955) and five in Cliftonville (1955–1956). Further post-war camps were opened in the 1960s at Bognor Regis (1960), Minehead (1962) and Barry Island (1966). A site was acquired and permission given for a further camp at Holme Dunes, Norfolk. However, these plans were abandoned after the devastating floods of 31 January 1953; the site was later purchased by the Norfolk Naturalists Trust in 1965.

The camps at Ayr and Skegness also had separate self-contained hotels within their grounds. In later years, they were joined by further hotels in Scarborough (1978), Llandudno (1981), London (1993), a sixth hotel at Cliftonville and one in Spain (1983). In the 1960s and 1970s, the company also operated the Top of the Tower revolving restaurant at the then-named Post Office Tower in London.   
 
In 1968, Butlin's son Bobby took over the management of Butlin's, and in 1972 the business was sold to the Rank Organisation for £43 million. The number of camps peaked at ten between 1966 and 1980, but the business experienced the problems being faced by the British seaside holiday industry as a whole, with the introduction of cheap package holidays to Mediterranean resorts from the 1960s onwards. It also had an image problem of being seen as providing regimented holidays, which caused it to all but abandon the Butlin's name at its remaining resorts between 1987 and 1990.

The camp at Mosney closed in 1982, Clacton and Filey closed in 1983, and the camp at Barry was sold in 1986 (eventually closing in 1996). The lease on the Top of the Tower restaurant expired in 1980. In 1998, the camps at Ayr and Pwllheli were handed over to Butlin's sister company; Haven. All the Butlin's hotels dating from the 1950s to 1990s were sold in 1998, but most are still open today under different ownership. The art deco style Ocean Hotel at Saltdean has been redeveloped into apartments, and the hotels at Cliftonville have both been demolished.

In 1998, the "Holiday Worlds" branding was dropped for the remaining resorts in favour of returning the emphasis to the core Butlin's name. Subsequently, in September 2000, the resorts and brand were sold to Bourne Leisure. A new Butlin's logo was eventually introduced in 1999, which has subsequently undergone several modifications and was used until 2011 when Butlin's introduced a design similar to their original logo. The new logo was originally only intended to be used temporarily to commemorate the 75th anniversary of Butlin's, but its use continued into 2012 and 2013 and is now the official logo.

In 2005, the new £10 million Shoreline hotel was unveiled at the Bognor Regis resort to expand on the existing variety of apartments on the site. The hotel, styled with an Art Deco theme, aimed to offer luxury accommodation in conjunction with the entertainment and facilities at the resort. Each of the 160 rooms features floor-to-ceiling windows, twin or king-size beds, leatherette chairs, televisions, DVD players and en-suite facilities. Some have sea views.  A second site, Ocean Hotel, opened at Bognor in 2009, styled in a high contemporary standard.

In September 2022, it was announced that Blackstone Group that had bought Butlins in 2021 and the Bourne Leisure Group, sold Butlins back to one of the original founding families of Bourne Leisure. In a £300 million deal The Harris Family Trust bought back Butlins, the deal however does not include Butlins property assets as these were sold earlier in the year to the UK’s largest pension fund, the Universities Superannuation Scheme for £300 million.

Locations

In addition to these main locations known at various times as "Holiday Camps", "Holiday Centres", "Holiday Villages", "Holiday Worlds" and more recently as "Resorts", Butlins also operated numerous smaller holiday parks in England and France for several years during the late 1970s. These were known as "Freshfields holidays" and were more basic parks with far fewer facilities and little or no entertainment. They were aimed at those wanting a quieter, more relaxed holiday.

Facilities

Accommodation

Butlins resorts offer various accommodation options to cater for different tastes and budgets. These range from "Standard" rooms and apartments to "Silver", "Gold", and "Deluxe" rooms and apartments for higher levels of luxury. There are also "BlueSkies" apartments available at Minehead, and 3 luxury hotels at Butlin's Bognor.

Butlins was originally known for its "chalet" accommodation, which for decades was the only form of accommodation and consisted of many long  blocks. These were arranged so that each line of chalets faced another line, with a grassed area in the middle. Originally there were no toilets in individual chalets (campers had to use communal toilet blocks located in the middle of every few chalet lines) and the furnishings were very basic. Many of these chalet lines are still in use today, but have been enlarged and significantly upgraded to modern standards. All chalets now have en-suite bathroom facilities.

One of the first chalets is still standing at the Skegness resort and is now heritage listed and a historical display only.

Skyline Pavilion

The "Skyline Pavilion" is a large area within each resort that is enclosed under a white tensile fabric canopy. These were created during the 1998-99 closed season by linking together several pre-existing buildings so that space within those buildings could be used to provide all-weather facilities within the Skyline Pavilions.

Each Skyline Pavilion contains a stage (used mainly for daytime children's shows), a cafe and associated seating, a bar (known as Bar Rosso, The Jellyfish Lounge, Soho Coffee or Costa Coffee), restaurants such as Burger King, Pizza Hut, Turner's, an amusement arcade, an information counter (termed "infunmation point"), and various shops selling novelties, souvenirs, and groceries. Many of the other venues and attractions in the resort can be accessed directly from within the Skyline Pavilion also.

Splash Waterworld
Each resort features a large indoor waterpark known as Splash Waterworld. These contain several waterslides, spas, a wave pool, and a lazy river. There is also a shallow pool area for young children, and sometimes an area for "serious" swimming. Minehead also has an outdoor toddler pool that is open in the summer months. Guests and day visitors can use these facilities at no additional cost. Skegness resort has recently opened a £16 million redevelopment of the Splash Waterworld that features 2 new octane flumes (Jet Stream and Vortex, which has a space-bowl) a new dinghy ride (The Riptide), a rope-walk challenge (Captain's Challenge) a lazy river, a poolside cafe and DJ. It also has a new outdoor fountain area that replaced the outdoor pool, the fountains go along with music (every hour) and lights.

Butlins opened a new Splash Waterworld at Bognor Regis in spring 2019.

Entertainment
There are various entertainment venues within the resorts including two large show bars known as "Centre Stage" and "Reds". Additionally, there are ABC cinemas, "Jaks" (a nightclub), "Crazy Horse" (an older style cabaret bar), "Hotshots" 10-pin bowling centre with bar and snooker tables, "Green Baize" snooker hall (originally at all camps but now at Skegness only), and several additional bars, pubs, and cafes which vary from one Butlins resort to another. Nearly all entertainment is included in the cost of the holiday or day visitor entry. Most recently, in May 2013, the character theatre in Bognor replaced the cinema.

Notable headliners at Centre Stage (Bognor Regis)
Spider-Man The Musical (30 April 1999 – 25 June 1999) 
The Mask Musical (28 June 1999 – 4 September 1999) 
Casper The Musical (6 September 1999 – 26 November 1999)

Notable headliners at Centre Stage (Minehead)
Casper The Musical (30 April 1999 – 25 June 1999)
Spider-Man The Musical (28 June 1999 – 4 September 1999) 
The Mask Musical (6 September 1999 – 26 November 1999) 
Tweenies Live! (2004)

Notable headliners at Centre Stage (Skegness)
The Mask Musical (30 April 1999 – 25 June 1999)
Casper The Musical (28 June 1999 – 4 September 1999)
Spider-Man The Musical (6 September 1999 – 26 November 1999)

Sports and recreation
Butlins resorts offer a variety of sports sessions and coaching, for example, archery, fencing, tennis (Skegness only), table tennis, and football. Most of these sessions are included in the cost of holiday or day visitor entry price.

For general recreation, facilities include multi-sports courts, adventure golf, adventure playgrounds, water zorbing, high ropes courses, funfair, inflatable castles/pillows, and go-karts.  Minehead resort also offers bumper boats, donkey rides, use of the adjacent golf course, and "Exmoor Adventures" country leisure pursuits. An additional charge usually applies for most of these activities, although the funfair is free.

Skegness and Bognor resorts each have a spa complex for massage, swimming, facials and other popular spa treatments.

Children's activities
There are a number of attractions and facilities at each resort provided especially for younger children. These include playgrounds, a supervised arts & crafts room, "Bob's Yard" (miniature funfair), a "Junior driving school" with small go-karts for children, and a nursery which can care for children and keep them entertained whilst parents enjoy other activities in the resort.

Bognor Regis

Butlins Bognor opened in 1960. The camp later became known as Southcoast World until 1998 and is now known as Butlins Bognor Regis Resort. In 1999 it was renovated again with the construction of a Skyline Pavilion. In 2005, a new £10m hotel called "The Shoreline" was unveiled at the Bognor Regis resort. A second hotel "The Ocean" opened on the site in Summer 2009 and general landscaping and upgrading also took place. In July 2012 a third hotel "The Wave" hotel was opened to guests.

Minehead

Butlins Minehead was opened to the public on 26 May 1962. It underwent substantial renovation in the 1980s, being renamed Somerwest World. In 1998 it was renovated again with the construction of a Skyline Pavilion. Since 1999 the Minehead resort has undergone further aesthetic upgrades. However, most of the original buildings remain, including almost all the original chalets. As such Minehead is now the last remaining Butlins camp that is still largely as Sir Billy designed it.   Minehead is the largest resort out of the three remaining open parks, and can hold up to 10,000 guests.

Mosney

Mosney was the first Butlins camp outside the UK. The camp opened in 1948, occupying some 200 acres (0.81 km2) of a former country estate. In 1982, Butlins sold the camp, which was renamed Mosney Holiday Centre. The camp continued without substantive changes, however, the last season for Mosney was 2000. Dwindling visitor numbers and problems finding staff for the short 12-week season eventually led to the camp's closure. In December 2000 a five-year deal was signed with the government to turn Mosney into a refugee centre. Mosney is now home to 700 refugees from over 20 countries. Like Minehead, most of the original buildings remain, including all the original chalets. Mosney is the only camp that has changed little since it was opened.

Skegness

Butlins Skegness was the first of Billy Butlin's holiday camps. The camp opened in 1936 but was taken over for military use in 1939, and known as HMS Royal Arthur. The camp reopened to holidaymakers in 1946. In 1987 the site underwent renovation with the construction of a modern fun pool and modernised accommodation, at this time the site was renamed Funcoast World. In 1998 it was renovated again with the construction of a Skyline Pavilion and since that time has undergone further improvements and maintenance in 2011 the resort underwent more development with the introduction of a new guest catering restaurant called The Deck, a new Italian styled restaurant called Ludo's (named after the dinosaur that appeared in the 2010/11 TV adverts), in 2013 the new Splash Waterworld opened adding a new £16 million state of the art pool area to the resort and plans have recently been submitted to modernise the resort once again with further investment into new restaurants and stores.

Barry Island

Butlins Barry Island was the last of Billy Butlin's holiday camps. The camp opened in 1966 and was sold to Majestic Holidays in 1987.

Ayr

Butlins Ayr was built by Billy Butlin as a naval training camp in 1940. The camp opened to the public in 1946.

In 1948 Butlin also opened a hotel on the site and a railway station serving the camp. In 1987 a refurbishment saw the camp re-branded Wonderwest World and the creation of a new indoor fun-pool along with modernised accommodation.

The site was re-branded to sister company Haven Holidays in 1999 and renamed Craig Tara. Since then, the focus has moved to replacing the original chalets with static caravans.

Pwllheli

Butlins Pwllheli was built by Billy Butlin as a naval training camp in 1940. After the war, the camp opened to the public in 1947. In 1987 a refurbishment saw the camp renamed Starcoast World and the creation of a new indoor fun-pool along with modernised accommodation. In 1999 the site was re-branded to sister company Haven Holidays and renamed Hafan Y Môr..

Butlins Park

In an early use of the name, in 1932 Billy Butlin opened an amusement park called Butlins Park at Littlehampton on the site of the old east bank fort and windmill. It is currently known as Harbour Park.

Special events

Spring Harvest

The largest Christian conference in Europe takes place at the Minehead and Skegness sites every Easter. The event attracts some 55,000 Christians from a range of denominations and plays host to many preachers, Christian musicians and dramatic artists. In previous years, the event has also been hosted at the Ayr and Pwllheli camps.

Music weekends
Butlins music weekends are over 18s only and are offered regularly across all of the three resorts. Each weekend has a different musical theme, including soul music, alternative, folk, disco, and rock and blues. They also have decade themed weekends from the 1960s to the 2000s. 
Butlins Music Weekends have played host to big-name acts such as Beverley Knight, Brand New Heavies, Toyah, Buzzcocks, Rick Astley, David Gest & Friends and many more. Madness have also held three weekends in Minehead on their House of Fun tour, taking over the whole resort for the weekend.

All Tomorrow's Parties

All Tomorrow's Parties was a music festival which takes place at Minehead. Named after the song "All Tomorrow's Parties" by the Velvet Underground, it was an alternative to larger mainstream festivals and was presented in a more intimate environment than a giant stadium or huge country field. All Tomorrow's Parties was a sponsorship-free festival where the organisers and artists stay in the same accommodation as the fans.

Bloc Weekend

Bloc Weekend is an annual music festival, devoted to electronic music of several genres, and incorporates both DJ sets and live shows. The first two Bloc events took place at Pontin's holiday camp in Norfolk. The 2009 event, which took place during 13–15 March, was moved to the larger Minehead resort. The 5,000 capacity event still sold out before the festival began. In 2010 and 2011, Bloc returned to Minehead for another sold-out show.

Butlins and Dodgem Cars
Dodgem Cars, a brand of bumper cars, were manufactured in the US by Dodgem Cars Ltd. Billy Butlin saw them and obtained the UK franchise. As a result, a Skegness funfair owned by Billy Butlin saw the first Dodgems cars in the UK in 1923.

Butlins Beaver Club on the radio
In 1956 Butlins Beaver Club – with Uncle Eric Winstrone was heard in the United Kingdom and much of continental Europe on Sunday nights at 6:00 pm over the 208 m wavelength of Radio Luxembourg.

Reds TV
The origins of the in-house TV system began in 1995 when Butlins decided to make use of the then 'empty' fifth channel (Channel 5 was still two years away from its launch). A teletext system was installed, together with a backing of incidental music, overseen by Redcoat/Stage Manager Tony Filer – and piped through to the guests' chalets to provide first an alternative, then an accompaniment to the printed programme of events. Filer (now a successful radio producer) installed a video camera in the new 'studio' to enable visiting celebrity interviews and 'Know your Redcoats' discussions to be shown. The Butlins 'Channel 5' name was changed to 'BTV' a year before the new fifth terrestrial TV channel emerged – and later became known as 'Reds TV'.

Publicity

Butlins badges

When booking in on arrival at Butlins (camp or hotel) each camper was issued with an enamel badge to wear for the duration of their holiday. The badge granted the camper readmission to the site should they take a trip out during their stay. Badges were worn with pride. Campers kept badges from previous holidays and wore them all on a ribbon.

Each year a different badge was produced for each camp with the name of the camp and the year forming part of the design.

The badges were made of die-stamped metal (usually brass), highly polished or chrome plated with the brightly coloured design made of vitreous enamel using a process similar to Champlevé but the troughs being stamped in rather than carved.

Each camp had at least one badge each year, with most of the larger camps having several colour variations throughout the season for improved security. Occasionally, two different designs would be used in one season.

Each badge was handmade by jewellery manufacturers in London, Dublin or in Birmingham's 'Jewellery Quarter'. The quality and beauty of the badges have ensured that many survive as heirlooms and are very collectable.

A collection of one badge per camp per year would total 192 badges. However, the myriad colour variations and additional 'special' badges would take the collection to over 1200 badges (although there is no definitive list of all variations).

Additional badges included 'Second Week' badges, Staff badges, 'Concessionaire' badges (for visiting tradesmen – these badges are distinguished by the absence of enamel), Committee badges, Christmas badges, Beaver Club badges, Reunion badges and many others.
Badges were not issued during Second World War years of 1940 to 1945 as the camps were taken over by the government and used as accommodation for war service personnel.

Notable badges include 'Skegness 1936' (the first badge issued) and 'Filey 1945', which features the 'V for Victory' in its design and is an exception to the gap of the war years as the camp was the first to reopen after the war just in time for the end of the season in August 1945.

Barry Island 1965 is the 'Holy Grail' of Butlins badges: the camp didn't open that year as planned. The badges were manufactured but never issued; some examples survive.

The original badges were issued every year from 1936 until 1967. In 2004, Butlins has again begun selling similar style badges in their on-resort souvenir shops. Some of these are of a more modern design, whilst some are close or exact replicas of badges from Butlins earlier days. The current badges, however, serve no purpose in identifying guests and are available purely as nostalgic souvenirs. Many regular guests like to swap badges with Butlins staff, who often have special badges to swap which are not otherwise available to guests. The badge collection ribbons are also sold in Butlins shops and may be used to pin multiple badges to.

Members of the Premier Club (Butlins loyalty club for regular guests) receive a free badge each time they visit, with a new design given each year.

Slogans
Throughout most of its history, Butlins has regularly advertised using various media. Examples of slogans include:
 Early slogans from the 1930s to 1950s included "Our True Intent Is All For Your Delight", "A weeks holiday for a weeks pay", "Holidays are Jollidays" and "Holidays with pay. Holidays with play!"
 1960s "You'll have a really wonderful time at Butlins by the sea"
 1970s "Butlinland is Freedomland" and "A holiday that's out of this world" (well known campaign that featured two blue-skinned alien characters called Toot and Ploot in various Butlin's locations).
 Early 1980s "A little bit of this, and quite a lot of that"
 Mid 1980s "Butlin it once and you'll do it again!"
 1990s "Let yourself go, and you won't want to leave" and "No.1 for family fun"
 Approx 1999–2002 "Come to life. Come to Butlins"
 Approx 2002–2004 "A million holidays. One Butlins"
 2005–2007 "Kids love it"
 2007–2009 "Altogether More Fun"
 2010 "Isn't it time you came round to Butlins?"
 2011 "Happy Days" then "Happiness is..."
 2012 to 2014 "Our True Intent Is All For Your Delight" (a return to the very first, William Shakespeare-inspired slogan used by Sir Billy Butlin)
2014 to 2020 "Butlins by the sea" same as the 1960s slogan with 'Our True Intent Is All For Your Delight' still very much in use around resort and for staff training
2020 "Ready to Butlins"

Butlins in popular culture
Butlins has appeared in popular culture too many times to list here. However, below are a few notable examples.

The 1947 film Holiday Camp was filmed mainly on location at Butlins Filey, although the establishing shot was of Butlins Skegness.

On the show The Two Ronnies (series 3, episode 1, first broadcast on 27 September 1973) there was a sketch parodying the BBC war drama Colditz. The two main characters finally escape over the wall of the infamous POW camp, only to wake up in a worse one – a dreary place called "Butlitz", a spoof of Butlins, where the German guards are dressed like Redcoats.

During the 1980s the BBC produced a sitcom called Hi-de-Hi! set in "Maplin's", a farcical holiday camp loosely styled on Butlins. Its writers (Jimmy Perry and David Croft) had themselves been Redcoats at Butlins. A later documentary series called Redcoats followed Redcoats through their seasons at Butlins.

In the film version of The Who's Tommy (1975) there is a 'Bernie's Holiday Camp' where Tommy's mother meets her new husband.

In the television show Lost the character of Charlie Pace learns to swim with his father at a Butlins camp.

The 1987 Doctor Who TV serial "Delta and the Bannermen" was filmed mainly at the Butlins camp on Barry Island, Wales. The camp is referred to as the 'Shangri-La' holiday camp, run by 'Burton'.

The song Stay Free by The Clash uses the term "Butlins" as slang for prison, as the singer (Mick Jones) asks his recently imprisoned friend, "I did my very best to write / How was Butlins? Were the screws too tight?" ("screws" being slang for prison guards).

Many books have been written about Butlins and its history, and about the life of Sir Billy Butlin. Some of these are:

 
 
 
 

There have also been a number of children's fiction books which include Butlins as a location or an integral part of the story. For example:

See also
 Haven Holidays
 HIT Entertainment
 Holiday camp
 Pontin's
 Redcoats (Butlins)
 Resort

References

External links

 
 BygoneButlins Butlins History
 bbc.co.uk/somerset: The Minehead Meander
 South Wales Echo story about Butlins early career and first-holiday camp
 Bognor Regis Regeneration at Butlins
 Butlins Memories
 Butlins Memories and Memorabilia

 
British companies established in 1936
Companies based in Dacorum
1936 establishments in England
Tourism in the United Kingdom
Hospitality companies established in 1936
Travel and holiday companies of the United Kingdom
2022 mergers and acquisitions